The 45th Assembly District of Wisconsin is one of 99 districts in the Wisconsin State Assembly.  Located in southern Wisconsin, the district comprises most of eastern and central Green County and western and southwestern Rock County.  It includes the western half of the city of Beloit, the cities of Evansville and Brodhead, and the villages of Albany and Orfordville.  It also contains Beloit College.  The district is represented by Democrat Clinton Anderson, since January 2023.

The 45th Assembly district is located within Wisconsin's 15th Senate district, along with the 43rd and 44th Assembly districts.

List of past representatives

References 

Wisconsin State Assembly districts
Green County, Wisconsin
Rock County, Wisconsin